Meritorious Artist Thành Được (born 1934 in Sóc Trăng of Cochinchina) was a Vietnamese actor and singer.

Biography
Thành Được has a real name Châu Văn Được (周文達), he was born in 1934 at Nhơn Mỹ Commune, Kế Sách District, Sóc Trăng Province, French Cochinchina.

Career

Classical music

 Lưu Bình – Dương Lễ
 Love story of An Lộc Sơn
 Cali chiều khóc bạn
 Cao Tiệm Ly tiễn Kinh Kha
 Chiều lạc lõng
 Đêm lạnh trong tù
 Lâu đài tình ái
 Lỗi nhịp cầu ô
 Nàng là ai
 Ngăn cách
 Người phu quét lá sân trường
 Nụ cười xuân
 Tà áo cưới
 Giã từ sân khấu
 Mưa rừng
 Tan vỡ mộng trăm năm
 20 năm làm thân viễn xứ
 Vợ tôi đi lấy chồng

Opera

 Chương (trong vở Ngôi nhà Ma)
 Diệp Băng Đình (Thuyền ra cửa biển)
 Dương Thiết Tâm (Anh hùng xạ điêu)
 Tang Xuanzong (Love story of An Lộc Sơn)
 Dũng (Đoạn Tuyệt)
 Hiếu (Bông hồng cài áo)
 Lĩnh Nam (Sân khấu về khuya)
 Phi (Nắng sớm mưa chiều)
 Võ Minh Thành (Life of lady Lựu)
 Thi Đằng (Tiếng hạc trong trăng)
 Tô Điền Sơn (Khi hoa Anh Đào nở)
 Tùng (trong vở Nửa đời hương phấn)
 Văn (trong vở Con gái chị Hằng)
 White shirt of lady Mộng Trinh
 Bên đồi trăng cũ
 Bọt biển
 Cầu sương thiếp phụ chàng
 Chưa tắt lửa lòng
 Chuyện tình 17
 Đợi anh mùa lá rụng
 Giấc mộng giữa Hoàng lăng
 Khói sóng tiêu tương
 Nữa bản tình ca
 The beauty in Baghdad
 Rồi 30 năm sau
 Tấm lòng của biển
 Tình xuân muôn tuổi

Film
 Shadow on the road (1973)

Honor
 Golden medal of Thanh Tâm Award in 1966 with character Thi-Đằng the Robbery of drama Crane's voice at the moonlight.

References

 Nghệ sĩ Lệ Thủy xúc động khi gặp lại nghệ sĩ Thành Được

1934 births
Living people
Hoa people
People from Sóc Trăng province
Vietnamese male film actors
20th-century Vietnamese male singers
Vietnamese businesspeople
American musicians of Vietnamese descent
American people of Chinese descent
Vietnamese emigrants to the United States